Nur Shamie Iszuan bin Amin (born 10 September 1995) is a Malaysian professional footballer who plays as a winger for Malaysia Super League side Sri Pahang.

Career statistics

Club

References

External links
 

1995 births
Living people
Malaysian footballers
Sarawak FA players
Negeri Sembilan FA players
Sarawak United FC players
Malaysia Premier League players
Malaysia Super League players
Association football wingers